Lameck Bonjisi (1973 – 8 November 2004) was a Zimbabwean sculptor.

The brother of Witness and Tafunga Bonjisi, both of whom he mentored, Bonjisi began sculpting full-time at 17.  He worked for a time as an assistant to Nicholas Mukomberanwa before setting out on his own.  He died at 30.

References
Biographical sketch

1973 births
2004 deaths
20th-century Zimbabwean sculptors
21st-century sculptors